Yvonne Ruth Killmer (born Yvonne-Ruth Freyer:  12 September 1921 – 27 September 2014) was a successful East German journalist and party official.   During the 1960s she served as head of the government press office.   She later became editor in chief of "Freies Wort", a mass circulation party newspaper.  Subsequently she became the first editor in chief at the women's magazine, "Für Dich".   Her last big job, between 1968 and 1983, was as editor in chief with the East German bi-monthly fashion magazine, "Sibylle".

Life 
Yvonne-Ruth Freyer was born in Berlin at the "Urban Krankenhaus" (district hospital).   Her mother later recalled that there was a strike running at the time, as a result of which the water and electricity supplies had been cut:  she liked to tell people she had been born by candle light.    Her parents were committed socialists and Yvonne-Ruth would later be able to look back with pride on a highly politicised upbringing.      Erich Freyer, her father was a book dealer who had recently taken on an artisanal publishing business from the socialist activist Adolph Hoffmann.  (The printing press had been used in 1891 to produce Hoffmann's at the time still famous / notorious pamphlet "Die zehn Gebote und die besitzende Klasse" - "The ten commandments and the property-owning classes".}

In January 1933 the National Socialists took power and rapidly transformed Germany into a one-party dictatorship.   As well networked Berlin socialists with their own printing press it quickly became obvious that the Freyers would find themselves attracting the intense interest of the security services:  later during 1933 they emigrated to Amsterdam where between 1933 and 1935 Yvonne-Ruth attended upper school.   Her parents subsequently moved again, this time to France, while she returned to Germany, where between 1935 and 1938 she lived with her grandmother in Glauchau, a small sleepy town in the hills beyond Leipzig.   Till 1938 she attended the "Handelsschule" in Glauchau, where the curriculum would have been designed to prepare her for work in the world of business and commerce.   Between 1937 and 1940 she undertook and completed an apprenticeship in office work.

War had broken out in 1939, and from 1941 till 1943 Freyer worked as a typist at the Senior Aviation Engineering Academy ("Höheren Fliegertechnischen Schule") in Jüterbog.  She was then employed as a typist, between 1943 and 1945, by Märkle & Kniesche, a tobacco products wholesaler in Leipzig.   During the war she had an illegitimate child:  sources do not elaborate.

Leipzig and the surrounding region were liberated from the National Socialist government by US forces on 18 April 1945, but by this time it had already been agreed the previous September between President Roosevelt (who died on 12 April, the week before the capture of the city), Marshal Stalin and (with varying levels of enthusiasm) other "allied leaders", that after the war Leipzig would be part of a large region in central Germany to be administered as the Soviet occupation zone.   Early in July 1945 the Americans withdrew and the Red Army moved in.   Membership of political parties - other than of the National Socialist party - had been illegal since 1933, but under allied occupation this was no longer the case.   During 1945 Yvonne-Ruth Freyer joined the Communist Party.   Reflecting a widespread determination that, at least in Germany, populist street politicians should never again be able to exploit divisions on the political left in order to take power, in April 1946 a contentious merger was implemented - in reality effective only in the Soviet zone - between the Communist Party and the Social Democratic Party.   Freyer was one of hundreds of thousands of Communist Party members who lost no time in using the pre-printed form, which the party authorities had helpfully prepared, to sign their party membership over to the new Socialist Unity Party ("Sozialistische Einheitspartei Deutschlands" / SED).   Meanwhile she made her way back to Glauchau where, between 1945 and 1947, she worked as a member of the office support staff at the local police station.

During 1945 and 1946 she also found time to undertake voluntary (unpaid) work with the Dresden-based Sächsische Zeitung.   Responsibility for each day's edition seems to have been rotated on a daily basis between those whose political backgrounds favoured the Social Democratic version of socialism and those, such as Freyer, who had come from the Communist Party.  Tasks were allocated among the staff on a correspondingly variable basis.   Freyer's own baptism of fire came when she was sent to report on a party meeting addressed by Walter Ulbricht, a local man who had spent the war years in Moscow.   Ulbricht was already emerging, within the Soviet zone, as an important orthodox Stalinist member of the party leadership.   By the time the zone was relaunched, in October 1949, as the Soviet sponsored German Democratic Republic (East Germany), Walter Ulbricht would be uneasily ensconced not as one among several, but as the de facto leader of the party, and thereby also of the state and of the government.   As she much later recalled, back in 1946 Freyer felt more than a little overwhelmed by her mission:  "He might have been speaking in Chinese.  I didn't understand a word".

Most of her more politically enthused contemporaries were at this point still working as youth leaders with the party's recently inaugurated Free German Youth organisation, but the newspaper internship, though challenging, evidently suited Freyer well.   It provided the opportunity to learn the journalists' craft from more experienced comrades such as the Spanish Civil War veteran, Georg Stibi, who later became a deputy Foreign Minister of the German Democratic Republic.   During 1947/48 she undertook a six month course in journalism at the Karl-Marx Party Academy at Liebenwalde, just outside Berlin.   During 1948 and 1949 she then worked as a regional press officer in Saxony for the Democratic Women's League ("Demokratischer Frauenbund Deutschlands" / DFD), which was one of five important quasi-party mass organisations which under the Leninist constitutional structure adopted from the Soviet Union had a fixed quota of seats in the East German parliament ("Volkskammer") in what by this time was becoming a new kind of German one-party dictatorship.   During 1949/50 she worked for the ruling party's regional leadership team ("... SED-Landesleitung Sachsen").

In 1951 Yvonne-Ruth Freyer was appointed editor in chief of the regional Zwickau-based party regional newspaper "Freie Presse".   This made her the first female editor in chief of a mass-circulation newspaper anywhere in East Germany.  Her incumbency was brief, however, since in 1952 she was transferred to the newly launched party newspaper "Freies Wort", published in Suhl.   She was the paper's founding editor, and remained in editorial control of it till 1959.   Between 1956 and 1960 she combined this with membership of the  party regional leadership team ("SED-Bezirksleitung") for Suhl, also - for some of the time - chairing the local branch of the national Union of Journalists.   After this, having been awarded a "service medal", during 1959/60 she underwent a further training course at the Karl-Marx Party Academy (which by this time was accommodated in central Berlin).

In 1960 she accepted a post as press officer for the chairman of the East German Council of Ministers.  In reality her duties involved acting as an additional "control authority", monitoring the media on behalf of ministers.   The job came with high status and a large office in Berlin:  she also found the posting highly educative.  She moved back to Saxony in 1962 and took over at "Für Dich", an illustrated newspaper targeting women.   A "test edition" was produced in December 1962: starting in 1963, "Für Dich" then appeared as a weekly publication for nearly three decades.   "Für Dich" had few obvious rivals and, at its peak, achieved a circulation in East Germany of almost a million copies.  Freyer served as its editor in chief between 1962 and 1968.   The job involved frequent interaction with Lotte Ulbricht, the leader's wife, who took a close interest in the magazine.   Recalling the situation many years later Yvonne-Ruth would insist that she had enough backbone, relevant experience and political dexterity to handle it.   As before, Freyer's editorial duties were combined with other political responsibilities.   Between 1964 and 1969 Freyer served as a national presidium member with the DFD.   For some of this time she also served as a member of the so-called "Women Commission" set up by and reporting to the Politburo, which was the inner caucus of the powerful Party Central Committee.   Between 1968 and 1981 Yvonne-Ruth Freyer was editor in chief of the high-profile (and, some thought, unapologetically escapist) women's magazine "Sibylle".

Personal 
In October 1981 Yvonne-Ruth Freyer married the journalist Lothar „Kolja“ Killmer (1919–2000).   It was her first marriage and his second.   Her husband's first wife, Anja Killmer-Korn, had died five months earlier.   Anja, who came originally from Vienna,  had been a resistance activist during the Hitler years and was twenty-three years older than her husband.   Yvonne-Ruth had known both of them since 1946, having met "Kolja" Killmer on a course back then.   There are suggestions that she had come close to becoming his first wife, before having to relocate from Saxony in order to spend a term at the Karl-Marx Party Academy near Berlin.   Although she was already 60, and her husband 62, when they married, the two of them went on to enjoy an exceptionally happy 18 years of marriage together.

Notes

References 

People from Berlin
East German journalists
East German women
Journalists from Berlin
German women journalists
Women magazine editors
Women newspaper editors
Socialist Unity Party of Germany members
Communist Party of Germany members
1921 births
2014 deaths
20th-century German women
German newspaper editors